Dean Baker (born July 13, 1958) is an American macroeconomist who co-founded the Center for Economic and Policy Research (CEPR) with Mark Weisbrot. Baker has been credited as one of the first economists to have identified the 2007–08 United States housing bubble.

Early life and education 
Baker grew up in the Lake View neighborhood of Chicago, Illinois. In 1981, Baker graduated from Swarthmore College with a bachelor's degree in history with minors in economics and philosophy. In 1983, he received a master's degree in economics from the University of Denver. In 1988, he received a PhD from the University of Michigan in economics.

Career 
Baker was a lecturer at the University of Michigan from 1988 to 1989 and an assistant professor of economics at Bucknell University from 1989 to 1992. From 1992 to 1998, he was an economist at the Economic Policy Institute. During this time, he published a paper with Mark Weisbrot in a journal of evolutionary economics.

In 1999, Baker and Weisbrot co-founded the Center for Economic and Policy Research (CEPR), a US independent, nonpartisan think tank that produces economic research on US national affairs (social security, healthcare, the US national budget), and international topics (the global economy, the International Monetary Fund or Latin America policy). In that same year Baker was a senior research fellow at the Preamble Center for Public Policy.

Baker has consulted with officials from the World Bank and provided testimony to the Joint Economic Committee of the U.S. Congress and to the OECD's Trade Union Advisory Council.

From 1996 to 2006, Baker was the author of a weekly online commentary on the economic reporting of The New York Times and The Washington Post, the Economic Reporting Review. Since 2006, he has continued this commentary on his blog Beat The Press, formerly published at The American Prospect and now on CEPR's website.

2007–08 United States housing bubble 
In 2006 Baker predicted that "plunging housing investment will likely push the economy into recession." That year he published "Recession Looms for the U.S. Economy in 2007", in which he predicted that weakness in the US housing market was likely in 2007 to push the US economy into a recession.

Baker won the Revere Award, along with Steve Keen and Nouriel Roubini, for predicting the crash of the United States housing bubble and the resulting recession, which occurred from 2007 to 2008. He warned about the coming crisis and the related government policies in multiple articles, op-eds and interviews from 2002 to 2005. Basing his outlook on housing price data sets produced by the U.S. government, Baker asserted that there was a bubble in the US housing market in August 2002, well before its peak, and predicted that the bubble's collapse would lead to recession. His prediction for when the recession would start was off by only one quarter.

Regarding the housing bubble, Baker was critical of Federal Reserve chair Alan Greenspan. He has also been critical of the regulatory framework of the real estate and financial industries, the use of financial instruments like collateralized debt obligation, and U.S. politicians and regulators' performance and conflicts of interest.

Baker opposed the U.S. government bailout of Wall Street banks on the basis that the only people who stood to lose from their collapse were their shareholders and high-income CEOs. Of any hypothetical negative effects of not extending the bailout, he said, "We know how to keep the financial system operating even as banks go into bankruptcy and receivership," citing U.S. government action taken during the S&L crisis of the 1980s. He has ridiculed the U.S. elite for favoring it, asking, "How do you make a DC intellectual look less articulate than Sarah Palin being interviewed by Katie Couric? That's easy. You ask them how failure to pass the bailout will give us a Great Depression."

Rigged  

Baker's 2016 book Rigged: How Globalization and the Rules of the Modern Economy Were Structured to Make the Rich Richer argues that changing how the U.S. economy has been managed over the past 50 years would add between $2 and 3.7 trillion (in constant 2016 dollars) to the U.S. GDP, between 11 and 20 percent. This is summarized in his Table 8-1:

In Rigged, Baker argues that, for example, focusing more on decreasing unemployment and less on minimizing inflation would primarily benefit the bottom 99%, though the top 1% would get some of those gains. Similarly, Baker says that changes in patent and copyright law over the past 50 years have violated their purpose under the Copyright Clause of the Constitution: "To promote the progress of science and the useful arts". He concludes that if the U.S. had spent the same amount on research and media with the results being placed in the public domain, everyone would be better off, with the possible exception of the ultra-wealthy. In particular, the world would be healthier not having to pay patent royalties to U.S. pharmaceutical companies.

He also writes that so-called free-trade agreements have exempted doctors and other highly paid professionals, not because of any intrinsic difference in what they do, but because they have more political power than organized labor.

Political activity 
As a graduate student at the University of Michigan, Baker participated in and was arrested at two sit-ins protesting Representative Carl Pursell's votes for military aid to the Contras. In 1986, Baker defeated Donald Grimes in the Democratic primary and ran unsuccessfully against Pursell to represent Michigan's second Congressional district; his candidacy opposed aid to the Contras.

In 2020, Baker endorsed Elizabeth Warren's 2020 presidential campaign. He is a visiting professor at the University of Utah.

Personal life 
Baker is married to economist Helene Jorgensen. They live in southern Utah.

Bibliography

Selected articles

Books

References

Further reading 
 Dean Baker presentation on 2008–2009 economic trouble at Bucknell University
 NPR's Fresh Air (Audio): "The Key to Economic Stimulus?", January 13, 2009
 Bill Moyers Journal (Video), August 8, 2008
 News Hour with Jim Lehrer (Video): "Massive Job Cuts Renew Calls for Quick Action on Stimulus", January 26, 2009
 C-SPAN's Book TV (Video): "Plunder and Blunder: The Rise and Fall of the Bubble Economy", January 27, 2009
 Marketplace Public Radio (Audio): We Demand to See More Transparency, March 9, 2009
 
 Dean Baker: Banks Could Be Big Winners of President Obama’s Foreclosure Prevention Program – video by Democracy Now!
 
 Video (and audio) of debates & discussions involving Baker on Bloggingheads.tv
 Dean Baker argues that the debate over the economy should not be over whether to regulate, but how  in the Boston Review

External links 

 
 Dean Baker at Center for Economic and Policy Research
 "Beat The Press"
 
 
 

1958 births
21st-century American economists
American economics writers
American male non-fiction writers
Bucknell University faculty
Center for Economic and Policy Research
Economists from Illinois
Economists from Utah
International finance economists
Living people
Macroeconomists
Swarthmore College alumni
University of Denver alumni
University of Michigan College of Literature, Science, and the Arts alumni
University of Utah faculty
Writers about globalization
Writers from Chicago
Writers from Utah